Alfred Marpole Waldron (September 21, 1865 – June 28, 1952) was a Republican member of the United States House of Representatives for Pennsylvania.

Alfred Waldron was born in Philadelphia, Pennsylvania.  He became engaged in the insurance business.  He was a member of the Philadelphia Select Council from 1911 to 1924, and a member of the Republican city committee from 1916 to 1936.  He was a delegate to the Republican National Conventions in 1924, 1928, and 1932.

Waldron was elected as a Republican to the 73rd Congress but did not seek renomination in 1934.

Sources

Philadelphia City Council members
1865 births
1952 deaths
Republican Party members of the United States House of Representatives from Pennsylvania